Johann Dallinger von Dalling (1741–1806) was an Austrian painter born in Vienna. He distinguished himself as director of the Liechtenstein Gallery. He painted animals, historical subjects, and large altar-pieces, most of which are in Russia and Poland.

References
 

1741 births
1806 deaths
18th-century Austrian painters
18th-century Austrian male artists
Austrian male painters
19th-century Austrian painters
19th-century Austrian male artists
Artists from Vienna